The following events are associated with the year 1238 AD in poetry.

Births
 Yao Sui (died 1313), writer of Chinese Sanqu poetry and an official
 Homam-e Tabrizi born either 1238 or 1239 (died 1314), Persian poet of the Ilkhanid era

Deaths
 Elazar Rokeach (born 1176), a Talmudist, Cabalist, moralist, scientist and poet
 Sighvatr Sturluson (born 1170), skaldic poet, goði and member of the Icelandic Sturlungar clan
 Awhad al-Din Kermani (probably 21 March), Persian Sufi poet

Events

13th-century poetry
Poetry